Libanocaris is an extinct genus of prawn, containing two species, Libanocaris curvirostra and Libanocaris rogeri.

References

Penaeidae
Prehistoric Malacostraca
Prehistoric crustacean genera